Mildred T. Stahlman (born July 31, 1922) is an American neonatologist and academic. She worked as a professor of pediatrics and pathology at Vanderbilt University in Nashville, Tennessee.

Early life
Mildred T. Stalhman was born on July 31, 1922, in Nashville, Tennessee. Her father, James Geddes Stahlman, was a Tennessee newspaper publisher who was opposed to desegregation and was a trustee of Vanderbilt University. Her paternal great-grandfather, Major Edward Bushrod Stahlman, was a German-born railroad executive, the owner of the Nashville Banner, and the developer of The Stahlman.

Stahlman graduated from the Vanderbilt University College of Arts and Science in 1943 and she earned her M.D. from the Vanderbilt University School of Medicine in 1946.

Career
Stahlman worked as an intern at the Lakeside Hospital in Cleveland, Ohio from 1946 to 1947 and as a pediatric intern at Boston Children's Hospital from 1947 to 1948. She then served as Assistant Resident at the Pediatric Service of the Vanderbilt University Medical Center from 1948 to 1948, and later as a cardiac resident at La Rabida Sanitarium and Exchange Fellow at Royal Caroline Institute in Stockholm, Sweden.

She spent the rest of her career at the Vanderbilt University School of Medicine.

Stahlman started the first newborn intensive care unit in the world, in order to use respiratory therapy for infants with damaged lungs. In addition, she has researched methods to prevent and treat disease, developed overseas fellowship exchange programs, and initiated the Angel Transport mobile intensive-care unit for newborns. She is an author on more than 100 peer-reviewed articles on neonatal care, focusing on the care of premature infants. Her publications include several papers on ethical and moral issues concerning extreme low birth rate infants.

She has received the Neonatal-Perinatal Medicine certification from the American Board of Pediatrics and the Pediatrics certification from the American Board of Pediatrics. Additionally, she received the American Pediatric Society's highest honor, the John Howland Award in 1996. Stahlman celebrated her 90th birthday in 2012, and turned 100 on July 31, 2022.

References

1922 births
Living people
American people of German descent
American centenarians
Women centenarians
People from Nashville, Tennessee
Vanderbilt University alumni
Vanderbilt University faculty
American neonatologists
Vanderbilt University School of Medicine alumni
Members of the National Academy of Medicine
Members of the Royal Swedish Academy of Sciences